Inpa is a genus of ground beetles in the family Carabidae. This genus has a single species, Inpa psydroides. It is found in Brazil.

References

Trechinae